The 2017 Winnipeg National Bank Challenger was a professional tennis tournament played on outdoor hard courts. It was the 2nd edition, for men, and 5th edition, for women, of the tournament and part of the 2017 ATP Challenger Tour and the 2017 ITF Women's Circuit, offering totals of $75,000, for men, and $25,000, for women, in prize money. It took place in Winnipeg, Manitoba, Canada between July 11 and July 16, 2017.

Men's singles main-draw entrants

Seeds

1 Rankings are as of July 3, 2017

Other entrants
The following players received wildcards into the singles main draw:
 Hugo Di Feo
 Jack Mingjie Lin
 Samuel Monette
 Nicaise Muamba

The following players received entry from the qualifying draw:
 Luke Bambridge
 Luis David Martínez
 Alex Rybakov
 Ronnie Schneider

Women's singles main-draw entrants

Seeds

1 Rankings are as of July 3, 2017

Other entrants
The following players received wildcards into the singles main draw:
 Isabelle Boulais
 Petra Januskova
 Catherine Leduc 
 Charlotte Robillard-Millette

The following player entered the singles main draw with a protected ranking:
 Kimberly Birrell

The following players received entry from the qualifying draw:
 Helen Abigail Altick
 Sara Daavettila
 Jessica Failla
 Leylah Annie Fernandez
 Nika Kukharchuk
 Alexandra Mueller
 Shelby Talcott
 Marcela Zacarías

Champions

Men's singles

 Blaž Kavčič def.  Peter Polansky, 7–5, 3–6, 7–5

Women's singles

 Caroline Dolehide def.  Mayo Hibi, 6–3, 6–4

Men's doubles
 
 Luke Bambridge /  David O'Hare def.  Yusuke Takahashi /  Renta Tokuda, 6–2, 6–2

Women's doubles

 Hiroko Kuwata /  Valeria Savinykh def.  Kimberly Birrell /  Caroline Dolehide, 6–4, 7–6(7–4)

External links
Official website

Winnipeg National Bank Challenger
Winnipeg National Bank Challenger
Winnipeg Challenger
Winnipeg National Bank Challenger